Otávio Augusto Braga, commonly known as  Otávio Augusto , (born 29 July 1973 in Iacanga, São Paulo) is a former Brazilian footballer (striker) who played for FK Sūduva. He is the youngest son of Emidio T. Braga and Julia T. Braga.

Otávio Augusto started his career as professional football player in Araraquara (São Paulo state) in the traditional Brazilian team, Associação Ferroviária de Esportes, with the master of football, Olivério Bazzani Filho, as his first coach.

Otávio Augusto also played for Joinville, União São João and Santos in Brazil before being hired by FC Luzern of Switzerland.He started his medical studies in 2007 at Kaunas University of Medicine - Lithuania, after announcing his retirement from professional football as a player.

Clubs
Associacao Ferroviaria de Esportes - Brazil
União São João Esporte Clube - Brazil
Joinville Esporte Clube - Brazil
Santos Futebol Clube - Brazil
FC Luzern - Switzerland
FC Wangen bei Olten - Switzerland
SV Muttenz - Switzerland
Società Sportiva Verbania Calcio - Italy
U.S.D. 1913 Seregno Calcio - Italy
S.S. Villacidrese Calcio - Italy
A.C. Castellettese - Italy
FK Sūduva - Lithuania

References

Living people
1973 births
Brazilian footballers
Santos FC players
SV Muttenz players
FK Sūduva Marijampolė players
S.S. Villacidrese Calcio players
U.S. 1913 Seregno Calcio players
Association football forwards
Footballers from São Paulo (state)